James Neil Hamilton (September 9, 1899 – September 24, 1984) was an American stage, film and television actor, best remembered for his role as Commissioner Gordon on the Batman TV series of the 1960s. During his motion picture career, which spanned more than a half century, Hamilton performed in over 260 productions in the silent and sound eras.

Acting career
An only child, Hamilton was born in Lynn, Massachusetts. His show business career began when he secured a job as a shirt model in magazine advertisements.

After this, he became interested in acting and joined several stock companies, where he gained experience and training as an actor in professional stage productions. This allowed him to get his first film role, in Vitagraph's The Beloved Impostor (1918). He got his big break in D. W. Griffith's The White Rose (1923). He traveled to Germany with Griffith and made a film about the incredibly harsh conditions in Germany after World War I, Isn't Life Wonderful (1924).

While he was filming America (1924), a soldier's arm was blown off. Actor Charles Emmett Mack recalled: "Neil Hamilton and I went to neighboring towns and raised a fund for him—I doing a song and dance and Neil collecting a coin."

Hamilton was signed by Paramount Pictures in the mid-1920s and became one of its leading men. He often appeared opposite Bebe Daniels. He played one of Ronald Colman's brothers in Paramount's original silent version of Beau Geste (1926) and Nick Carraway in the first film of The Great Gatsby (1926), now a lost film. He starred  with Victor McLaglen in John Ford's Mother Machree (1928), whose title coincidentally became Chief O'Hara's catchphrase in the Batman television series almost four decades later.

In 1930, Hamilton appeared in the original production of The Dawn Patrol (retitled "Flight Commander" after its remake), playing the squadron commander, who was played by Basil Rathbone in the 1938 remake. Hamilton was billed above newcomer Clark Gable in Laughing Sinners (1931), in which he played a cad who deserts Joan Crawford's brokenhearted character. He originated the role of milksop Harry Holt, Jane's fiancé, in Tarzan the Ape Man (1932), where he got top billing. Hamilton reprised the role in the pre-Code sequel Tarzan and His Mate (1934) at Metro-Goldwyn-Mayer. He made five films in England in 1936 and 1937.

"A"-level work in Hollywood dried up for Hamilton by the 1940s, and he was reduced to working in serials, "B" films, and other low-budget projects. He starred as the villain in King of the Texas Rangers (1941), one of the Republic Pictures most successful movie serials.

In Since You Went Away (1944), about life on the home front in World War II, Hamilton is seen only in still photographs as a serviceman away at war. His family's travails during his absence are the center of the movie. Hamilton reportedly shot scenes for the movie before filmmakers decided to keep his character off-screen. He appeared in the film noir When Strangers Marry (1944) with Robert Mitchum.

In a 1970s book interview for Whatever Happened to..., Hamilton said he had been banned from A level work for insulting a studio executive. A Roman Catholic, Hamilton said that his faith got him through the difficult period of late 1942 to early 1944 when he could not obtain film employment and was down on his luck financially.

When television came along, Hamilton hosted Hollywood Screen Test (1948-1953), co-starred in the short-lived sitcom That Wonderful Guy with Jack Lemmon (1949–50), at the same time as Hollywood Screen Test,  and did guest shots on numerous series of the 1950s and 1960s such as seven episodes of Perry Mason in 1958 he played as murder victim Bertrand Allred in "The Case of the Lazy Lover", 1964 he played as murderer Grove Dillingham in "The Case of the Drifting Dropout", five episodes of 77 Sunset Strip, as well as Maverick, The Real McCoys, Mister Ed, Bachelor Father, The Outer Limits, and The Cara Williams Show. During the late 1940s and early 1950s, Hamilton performed on Broadway in Many Happy Returns (1945), The Men We Marry (1948), To Be Continued (1952), and Late Love (1953–54).

In 1960, actor Richard Cromwell was seeking a comeback of sorts in 20th Century Fox's planned production of The Little Shepherd of Kingdom Come but Cromwell died of complications from liver cancer. Producer Maury Dexter quickly signed Hamilton to replace Cromwell in the film, which co-starred Jimmie Rodgers and Chill Wills. During the 1960s, Hamilton appeared in three Jerry Lewis films: The Patsy (1964), The Family Jewels (1965), and Which Way to the Front? (1970).

Hamilton appeared as Police Commissioner James Gordon in all 120 episodes of the Batman television series (1966–68) as well as the 1966 film of the same name.  Yvonne Craig, who played Commissioner Gordon's daughter Barbara, said Hamilton "came every day to the set letter perfect in dialogue and never missed a beat—a consummate professional."

Personal life
Hamilton was married to Elsa Whitmer from 1922 until his death in September 1984. They had one child.

Hamilton was a Roman Catholic, and a member of the Good Shepherd Parish and the Catholic Motion Picture Guild in Beverly Hills, California.

Hamilton died at the age of 85 on September 24, 1984 after suffering a severe asthma attack. After his cremation, his ashes were later scattered into the Pacific Ocean.

Filmography

The Beloved Impostor (1918)
The Great Romance (1919)
The White Rose (1923) as John White
America (1924) as Nathan Holden
The Sixth Commandment (1924) as Robert Fields
The Side Show of Life (1924) as Charles Verity-Stewart
Isn't Life Wonderful (1924) as Paul
Men and Women (1925) as Ned Seabury
The Little French Girl (1925) as Giles Bradley
The Street of Forgotten Men (1925) as Philip Peyton
The Golden Princess (1925) as Tennessee Hunter
New Brooms (1925) as Thomas Bates Jr.
The Splendid Crime (1925) as Bob Van Dyke
Desert Gold (1926) as George Thorne
Beau Geste (1926) as Digby Geste
The Great Gatsby (1926) as Nick Carraway
Diplomacy (1926) as Julian Weymouth
The Music Master (1927) as Beverly Cruger
Ten Modern Commandments (1927) as Tod Gilbert
The Joy Girl (1927) as John Jeffrey Fleet
The Spotlight (1927) as Norman Brooke
Mother Machree (1928) as Brian
The Shield of Honor (1928) as Jack MacDowell
The Showdown (1928) as Wilson Shelton
Something Always Happens (1928) as Roderick Keswick
Don't Marry (1928) as Henry Willoughby
The Grip of the Yukon (1928) as Jack Elliott
Hot News (1928) as Scoop Morgan
The Patriot (1928) as Crown Prince Alexander
Take Me Home (1928) as David North
Three Weekends (1928) as James Gordon
What a Night! (1928) as Joe Madison
Why Be Good? (1929) as Winthrop Peabody Jr.
A Dangerous Woman (1929) as Bobby Gregory
The Studio Murder Mystery (1929) as Tony White
The Love Trap (1929) as Paul Harrington
The Mysterious Dr. Fu Manchu (1929) as Dr. Jack Petrie
Darkened Rooms (1929) as Emory Jago
The Kibitzer (1930) as Eddie Brown
The Return of Dr. Fu Manchu (1930) as Dr. Jack Petrie
The Dawn Patrol (1930) as Major Brand
Anybody's War (1930) as Red Reinhardt
Ladies Must Play (1930) as Anthony Gregg
The Cat Creeps (1930) as Charles Wilder
Ex-Flame (1930) as Sir Carlisle Austin
The Widow From Chicago (1930) as 'Swifty' Dorgan
Command Performance (1931) as Peter Fedor / Prince Alexis
Strangers May Kiss (1931) as Alan
The Spy (1931) as Ivan Turin
Laughing Sinners (1931) as Howard 'Howdy' Palmer
The Great Lover (1931) as Carlo
This Modern Age (1931) as Robert 'Bob' Blake Jr.
The Sin of Madelon Claudet (1931) as Larry
The Wet Parade (1932) as Roger Chilcote, Jr.
Are You Listening? (1932) as Jack Clayton
Tarzan the Ape Man (1932) as Harry Holt
The Woman in Room 13 (1932) as Paul Ramsey
What Price Hollywood? (1932) as Lonny Borden
Two Against the World (1932) as Mr. David 'Dave' Norton
The Animal Kingdom (1932) as Owen Fiske
As the Devil Commands  (1932) as Dr. David Graham
Terror Aboard (1933) as James Cowles
The World Gone Mad (1933) as Lionel Houston
The Silk Express (1933) as Donald Kilgore
As the Devil Commands (1933) as Dr. David Graham
One Sunday Afternoon (1933) as Hugo Barnstead
Ladies Must Love (1933) as Bill Langhorne
Mr. Stringfellow Says No (1934) as Jeremy Stringfellow
Tarzan and His Mate (1934) as Harry Holt
Here Comes the Groom (1934) as Jim
Blind Date (1934) as Bob
Once to Every Bachelor (1934) as Lyle Stuart
One Exciting Adventure (1934) as Walter Stone
Two Heads on a Pillow (1934) as John C. Smith
By Your Leave (1934) as David McKenzie
Fugitive Lady (1934) as Donald Brooks
Mutiny Ahead (1935) as Kent Brewster
Honeymoon Limited (1935) as Dick Spencer Gordon / Gulliver
Keeper of the Bees (1935) as James 'Jamie' Lewis McFarland
The Daring Young Man (1935) as Gerald Raeburn
Parisian Life (1936) as Jaques
Southern Roses (1936) as Reggie
Everything in Life (1936) as Geoffrey Loring
You Must Get Married (1936) as Michael Brown
Secret Lives (1937) as Lt. Pierre de Montmalion
Mr Stringfellow Says No (1937) as Earle Condon
Lady Behave! (1937) as Stephen Cormack
Hollywood Stadium Mystery (1938) as Bill Devons
Army Girl (1938) as Capt. Joe Schuyler
The Saint Strikes Back (1939) as Allan Breck
Queen of the Mob (unbilled; 1940) as First FBI Chief
Federal Fugitives (1941) as Capt. James Madison / Robert Edmunds
They Meet Again (1941) as Gov. John C. North
Father Takes a Wife (1941) as Vincent Stewart
Dangerous Lady (1941) as Duke Martindel
King of the Texas Rangers (1941) as John Barton
Look Who's Laughing (1941) as Hilary Horton
The Lady Is Willing (1942) as Charlie (uncredited)
Too Many Women (1942) as Richard Sutton
X Marks the Spot (1942) as John J. Underwood
Secrets of the Underground (1942) as Harry Kermit
Bombardier (1943) as Colonel (uncredited)
All by Myself (1943) as Mark Turner
The Sky's the Limit (1943) as Navy Officer on Train (uncredited)
When Strangers Marry (1944) as Lieutenant Blake
Brewster's Millions (1945) as Mr. Grant
Murder in Villa Capri (1955) as Police Capt. Brady
The Little Shepherd of Kingdom Come (1961) as Gen. Dean
The Devil's Hand (1962) as Francis Lamont
Good Neighbor Sam (1964) as Larry Boling
The Patsy (1964) as The Barber
The Family Jewels (1965) as Attorney
Madame X (1966) as Scott Lewis (uncredited)
Batman (1966) as Commissioner Gordon
Strategy of Terror (1969) as Mr. Harkin
Which Way to the Front? (1970) as Chief of Staff

References

External links

 
 
 
 1966 Batman TV Heroes – Neil Hamilton
 1941 They Meet Again – Neil Hamilton as Governor John C. North – at Internet Archive
 Photographs of Neil Hamilton

1899 births
1984 deaths
American male film actors
American male silent film actors
American male television actors
Actors from Lynn, Massachusetts
Deaths from asthma
20th-century American male actors
Catholics from Massachusetts